The Sri Lanka national cricket team toured England from 8 May to 5 July 2016 for a three-match Test series, a five-match One Day International (ODI) series and a one-off Twenty20 International (T20I) against the England cricket team. England won the Test series 2–0, the ODI series 3–0 and won the one-off T20I match by 8 wickets.

They also played two first-class matches against Essex and Leicestershire prior to the Test series, and two ODI matches against Ireland prior to the ODI series. The two first-class matches were both drawn and Sri Lanka won the ODI series against Ireland 2–0.

In April 2016, the ECB made a proposal that the series uses a points-based scoring system across all three formats, with both teams agreeing to the idea in principle. The following month, the points system was named Super Series and approved for this series and England's series against Pakistan. Four points were awarded for winning a Test match and two points for wins in ODIs or T20Is matches. No overall trophy was awarded, but there was a prize of £25,000, to be split amongst the players. England won the Super Series 20–4.

England

Squads

Kusal Perera replaced Dhammika Prasad in Sri Lanka's Test squad. Chris Woakes was added to England's squad for the second Test as a replacement for the injured Ben Stokes, who was later ruled out of the series. Dushmantha Chameera suffered a stress fracture in his lower back and was ruled out of the tour. Chaminda Bandara was named as Chameera's replacement. Following the ODI matches in Ireland, Shaminda Eranga was admitted to hospital in Dublin to undergo tests on his heart. However, on the same day, he was suspended from bowling in international matches by the International Cricket Council (ICC) due to an illegal action reported during the second Test. Prior to the third ODI, Lahiru Thirimanne was ruled out of the rest of the series with a lower back strain.

Tour matches

First-class: Essex vs Sri Lankans

First-class: Leicestershire vs Sri Lankans

Test series

1st Test

2nd Test

3rd Test

ODI series

1st ODI

2nd ODI

3rd ODI

4th ODI

5th ODI

T20I series

Only T20I

Ireland

Squads

ODI series

1st ODI

2nd ODI

References

External links
 Series home at ESPNCricinfo

2016 in Sri Lankan cricket
2016 in English cricket
2016 in Irish cricket
International cricket competitions in 2016
Sri Lankan cricket tours of England
Sri Lankan cricket tours of Ireland